There are at least 14 named lakes and reservoirs in Silver Bow County, Montana.

Lakes
 Emerald Lake, el. 
 Fish Lake, el. 
 Mud Lake, el.

Reservoirs
 Basin Creek Reservoir, el. 
 High Service Reservoir, el. 
 Moulton Distribution Reservoir, el. 
 Moulton Reservoir, el. 
 Moulton Reservoir Number 2, el. 
 Moulton Reservoir Number One, el. 
 South Fork Reservoir, el. 
 South Side Reservoir, el. 
 Upper Reservoir, el. 
 Upper Reservoir, el. 
 West Side Reservoir, el.

See also
 List of lakes in Montana

Notes

Bodies of water of Silver Bow County, Montana
Silver Bow